David Rollo may refer to:

 David Rollo (footballer) (1891–1963), Northern Ireland association football player
 David Rollo (politician) (1919–2006), Scottish nationalist politician and pirate radio broadcaster
 David Rollo (rugby union) (born 1934), Scottish rugby player